HAL 9000 is a fictional artificial intelligence character and the main antagonist in Arthur C. Clarke's Space Odyssey series.  First appearing in the 1968 film 2001: A Space Odyssey, HAL (Heuristically programmed ALgorithmic computer) is a sentient artificial general intelligence computer that controls the systems of the Discovery One spacecraft and interacts with the ship's astronaut crew. While part of HAL's hardware is shown toward the end of the film, he is mostly depicted as a camera lens containing a red or yellow dot, with such units located throughout the ship. HAL 9000 is voiced by Douglas Rain in the two feature film adaptations of the Space Odyssey series. HAL speaks in a soft, calm voice and a conversational manner, in contrast to the crewmen, David Bowman and Frank Poole.

In the film, HAL became operational on 12 January 1992 at the HAL Laboratories in Urbana, Illinois, as production number 3. The activation year was 1991 in earlier screenplays and changed to 1997 in Clarke's novel written and released in conjunction with the movie. In addition to maintaining the Discovery One spacecraft systems during the interplanetary mission to Jupiter (or Saturn in the novel), HAL has been shown to be capable of speech, speech recognition, facial recognition, natural language processing, lip reading, art appreciation, interpreting emotional behaviours, automated reasoning, spacecraft piloting and playing chess.

Appearances

2001: A Space Odyssey (film/novel)
HAL became operational in Urbana, Illinois, at the HAL Plant (the University of Illinois's  Coordinated Science Laboratory, where the ILLIAC computers were built). The film says this occurred in 1992, while the book gives 1997 as HAL's birth year.

In 2001: A Space Odyssey (1968), HAL is initially considered a dependable member of the crew, maintaining ship functions and engaging genially with his human crew-mates on an equal footing. As a recreational activity, Frank Poole plays chess against HAL. In the film, the artificial intelligence is shown to triumph easily. However, as time progresses, HAL begins to malfunction in subtle ways and, as a result, the decision is made to shut down HAL in order to prevent more serious malfunctions. The sequence of events and manner in which HAL is shut down differs between the novel and film versions of the story. In the aforementioned game of chess HAL makes minor and undetected mistakes in his analysis, a possible foreshadowing to HAL's malfunctioning.

In the film, astronauts David Bowman and Frank Poole consider disconnecting HAL's cognitive circuits when he appears to be mistaken in reporting the presence of a fault in the spacecraft's communications antenna. They attempt to conceal what they are saying, but are unaware that HAL can read their lips. Faced with the prospect of disconnection, HAL decides to kill the astronauts in order to protect and continue his programmed directives. HAL uses one of the Discoverys EVA pods to kill Poole while he is repairing the ship. When Bowman, without a space helmet, uses another pod to attempt to rescue Poole, HAL locks him out of the ship, then disconnects the life support systems of the other hibernating crew members. After HAL tells him "This mission is too important for me to allow you to jeopardize it", Bowman circumvents HAL's control, entering the ship by manually opening an emergency airlock with his service pod's clamps, detaching the pod door via its explosive bolts. Bowman jumps across empty space, reenters Discovery, and quickly re-pressurizes the airlock.

While HAL's motivations are ambiguous in the film, the novel explains that the computer is unable to resolve a conflict between his general mission to relay information accurately, and orders specific to the mission requiring that he withhold from Bowman and Poole the true purpose of the mission. With the crew dead, HAL reasons, he would not need to lie to them.

In the novel, the orders to disconnect HAL come from Dave and Frank's superiors on Earth. After Frank is killed while attempting to repair the communications antenna he is pulled away into deep space using the safety tether which is still attached to both the pod and Frank Poole's spacesuit. Dave begins to revive his hibernating crew mates, but is foiled when HAL vents the ship's atmosphere into the vacuum of space, killing the awakening crew members and almost killing Bowman, who is only narrowly saved when he finds his way to an emergency chamber which has its own oxygen supply and a spare space suit inside.

In both versions, Bowman then proceeds to shut down the machine. In the film, HAL's central core is depicted as a crawlspace full of brightly lit computer modules mounted in arrays from which they can be inserted or removed. Bowman shuts down HAL by removing modules from service one by one; as he does so, HAL's consciousness degrades. HAL finally reverts to material that was programmed into him early in his memory, including announcing the date he became operational as 12 January 1992 (in the novel, 1997). When HAL's logic is completely gone, he begins singing the song "Daisy Bell" as he gradually deactivates (in actuality, the first song sung by a computer, which Clarke had earlier observed at a text-to-speech demonstration). HAL's final act of any significance is to prematurely play a prerecorded message from Mission Control which reveals the true reasons for the mission to Jupiter.

2010: Odyssey Two (novel) and 2010: The Year We Make Contact (film)
In the 1982 novel 2010: Odyssey Two written by Clarke, HAL is restarted by his creator, Dr. Chandra, who arrives on the Soviet spaceship Leonov.

Prior to leaving Earth, Dr. Chandra has also had a discussion with HAL's twin, SAL 9000. Like HAL, SAL was created by Dr. Chandra. Whereas HAL was characterized as being "male", SAL is characterized as being "female" (voiced by Candice Bergen) and is represented by a blue camera eye instead of a red one.

Dr. Chandra discovers that HAL's crisis was caused by a programming contradiction: he was constructed for "the accurate processing of information without distortion or concealment", yet his orders, directly from Dr. Heywood Floyd at the National Council on Astronautics, required him to keep the discovery of the Monolith TMA-1 a secret for reasons of national security. This contradiction created a "Hofstadter-Moebius loop", reducing HAL to paranoia. Therefore, HAL made the decision to kill the crew, thereby allowing him to obey both his hardwired instructions to report data truthfully and in full, and his orders to keep the monolith a secret. In essence: if the crew were dead, he would no longer have to keep the information secret.

The alien intelligence initiates a terraforming scheme, placing the Leonov, and everybody in it, in danger. Its human crew devises an escape plan which unfortunately requires leaving the Discovery and HAL behind to be destroyed. Dr. Chandra explains the danger, and HAL willingly sacrifices himself so that the astronauts may escape safely. In the moment of his destruction the monolith-makers transform HAL into a non-corporeal being so that David Bowman's avatar may have a companion.

The details in the novel and the 1984 film 2010: The Year We Make Contact are nominally the same, with a few exceptions. First, in contradiction to the book (and events described in both book and film versions of 2001: A Space Odyssey), Heywood Floyd is absolved of responsibility for HAL's condition; it is asserted that the decision to program HAL with information concerning TMA-1 came directly from the White House.  In the film, HAL functions normally after being reactivated, while in the book it is revealed that his mind was damaged during the shutdown, forcing him to begin communication through screen text. Also, in the film the Leonov crew initially lies to HAL about the dangers that he faced (suspecting that if he knew he would be destroyed he would not initiate the engine burn necessary to get the Leonov back home), whereas in the novel he is told at the outset. However, in both cases the suspense comes from the question of what HAL will do when he knows that he may be destroyed by his actions.

In the novel, the basic reboot sequence initiated by Dr. Chandra is quite long, while the movie uses a shorter sequence voiced from HAL as: "HELLO_DOCTOR_NAME_CONTINUE_YESTERDAY_TOMORROW".

While Curnow tells Floyd that Dr. Chandra has begun designing HAL 10000, it has not been mentioned in subsequent novels.

2061: Odyssey Three and 3001: The Final Odyssey
In Clarke's 1987 novel 2061: Odyssey Three, Heywood Floyd is surprised to encounter HAL, now stored alongside Dave Bowman in the Europa monolith.

In Clarke's 1997 novel 3001: The Final Odyssey, Frank Poole is introduced to the merged form of Dave Bowman and HAL, the two merging into one entity called "Halman" after Bowman rescued HAL from the dying Discovery One spaceship toward the end of 2010: Odyssey Two.

Concept and creation

Clarke noted that the first film was criticized for not having any characters except for HAL, and that a great deal of the establishing story on Earth was cut from the film (and even from Clarke's novel).  Clarke stated that he had considered Autonomous Mobile Explorer–5 as a name for the computer, then decided on Socrates when writing early drafts, switching in later drafts to Athena, a computer with a female personality, before settling on HAL 9000. The Socrates name was later used in Clarke and Stephen Baxter's A Time Odyssey novel series.

The earliest draft depicted Socrates as a roughly humanoid robot, and is introduced as overseeing Project Morpheus, which studied prolonged hibernation in preparation for long term space flight.  As a demonstration to Senator Floyd, Socrates' designer, Dr. Bruno Forster, asks Socrates to turn off the oxygen to hibernating subjects Kaminski and Whitehead, which Socrates refuses, citing Asimov's First Law of Robotics.

In a later version, in which Bowman and Whitehead are the non-hibernating crew of Discovery, Whitehead dies outside the spacecraft after his pod collides with the main antenna, tearing it free. This triggers the need for Bowman to revive Poole, but the revival does not go according to plan, and after briefly awakening, Poole dies. The computer, named Athena in this draft, announces "All systems of Poole now No–Go. It will be necessary to replace him with a spare unit." After this, Bowman decides to go out in a pod and retrieve the antenna, which is moving away from the ship. Athena refuses to allow him to leave the ship, citing "Directive 15" which prevents it from being left unattended, forcing him to make program modifications during which time the antenna drifts further.

During rehearsals Kubrick asked Stefanie Powers to supply the voice of HAL 9000 while searching for a suitably androgynous voice so the actors had something to react to. On the set, British actor Nigel Davenport played HAL. When it came to dubbing HAL in post-production, Kubrick had originally cast Martin Balsam, but as he felt Balsam "just sounded a little bit too colloquially American", he was replaced with Douglas Rain, who "had the kind of bland mid-Atlantic accent we felt was right for the part". Rain was only handed HAL's lines instead of the full script, and recorded them across a day and a half.

HAL's point of view shots were created with a Cinerama Fairchild-Curtis wide-angle lens with a 160° angle of view. Stanley Kubrick chose to use the large Fairchild-Curtis lens to shoot the HAL 9000 POV shots because he needed a wide-angle fisheye lens that would fit onto his shooting camera, and this was the only lens at the time that would work. Bednarz adapted the lens design from an earlier lens he had designed for military training to simulate human peripheral vision coverage. The lens was later recomputed for the second Cinerama 360 film To the Moon and Beyond, which had a slightly different film format. To the Moon and Beyond was produced by Graphic Films and shown at the 1964/1965 New York World's Fair, where Kubrick watched it; afterwards, he was so impressed that he hired the same creative team from Graphic Films (consisting of Douglas Trumbull, Lester Novros, and Con Pederson) to work on 2001.

A HAL 9000 face plate, without lens (not the same as the hero face plates seen in the film), was discovered in a junk shop in Paddington, London, in the early 1970s by Chris Randall. This was found along with the key to HAL's Brain Room. Both items were purchased for ten shillings (£0.50). Research revealed that the original lens was a Fisheye Nikkor 8 mm 8. The collection was sold at a Christie's auction in 2010 for £17,500 to film director Peter Jackson.

Origin of name

HAL's name, according to writer Arthur C. Clarke, is derived from Heuristically programmed ALgorithmic computer. After the film was released, fans noticed HAL was a one-letter shift from the name IBM and there has been much speculation since then that this was a dig at the large computer company, something that has been denied by both Clarke and 2001 director Stanley Kubrick. Clarke addressed the issue in his book The Lost Worlds of 2001:
 ...about once a week some character spots the fact that HAL is one letter ahead of IBM, and promptly assumes that Stanley and I were taking a crack at the estimable institution ... As it happened, IBM had given us a good deal of help, so we were quite embarrassed by this, and would have changed the name had we spotted the coincidence. 
IBM was consulted during the making of the film and their logo can be seen on props in the film, including the Pan Am Clipper's cockpit instrument panel and on the lower arm keypad on Poole's space suit. During production it was brought to IBM's attention that the film's plot included a homicidal computer but they approved association with the film if it was clear any "equipment failure" was not related to their products.

HAL Communications Corporation is a real corporation, with facilities located in Urbana, Illinois, which is where HAL in the movie identifies himself as being activated: "I am a HAL 9000 computer. I became operational at the H-A-L plant in Urbana Illinois on the 12th of January 1992."

The former president of HAL Communications, Bill Henry, has stated that this is a coincidence: "There was not and never has been any connection to 'Hal', Arthur Clarke's intelligent computer in the screen play '2001' — later published as a book. We were very surprised when the movie hit the Coed Theatre on campus and discovered that the movie's computer had our name. We never had any problems with that similarity - 'Hal' for the movie and 'HAL' (all caps) for our small company. But, from time-to-time, we did have issues with others trying to use 'HAL'. That resulted in us paying lawyers. The offenders folded or eventually went out of business."

Technology

The scene in which HAL's consciousness degrades was inspired by Clarke's memory of a speech synthesis demonstration by physicist John Larry Kelly, Jr., who used an IBM 704 computer to synthesize speech. Kelly's voice recorder synthesizer vocoder recreated the song "Daisy Bell", with musical accompaniment from Max Mathews.

HAL's capabilities, like all the technology in 2001, were based on the speculation of respected scientists. Marvin Minsky, director of the MIT Computer Science and Artificial Intelligence Laboratory (CSAIL) and one of the most influential researchers in the field, was an adviser on the film set. In the mid-1960s, many computer scientists in the field of artificial intelligence were optimistic that machines with HAL's capabilities would exist within a few decades. For example, AI pioneer Herbert A. Simon at Carnegie Mellon University, had predicted in 1965 that "machines will be capable, within twenty years, of doing any work a man can do"

Cultural impact
HAL is listed as the 13th-greatest film villain in the AFI's 100 Years...100 Heroes & Villains.

The 9000th of the asteroids in the asteroid belt, 9000 Hal, discovered on May 3, 1981, by E. Bowell at Anderson Mesa Station, is named after HAL 9000.

Anthony Hopkins based his Academy Award-winning performance as Hannibal Lecter in Silence of the Lambs in part upon HAL-9000.

The 1993 educational game Where in Space Is Carmen Sandiego? features a digital assistant named the VAL 9000, a homage to HAL 9000.

Apple Inc.'s 1999 website advertisement "It was a bug, Dave" was made by meticulously recreating the appearance of HAL 9000 from the movie. Launched during the era of concerns over Y2K bugs, the ad implied that HAL's behavior was caused by a Y2K bug, before driving home the point that "only Macintosh was designed to function perfectly".

In 2003, HAL 9000 was one of the first robots to be inducted into the Robot Hall of Fame in Pittsburgh, Pennsylvania.  One can see a physical replica of HAL at the Carnegie Science Center in Pittsburgh.

See also

 List of fictional computers
 ILLIAC (University of Illinois at Urbana–Champaign)
 National Center for Supercomputing Applications (University of Illinois at Urbana–Champaign)
 Poole versus HAL 9000 (details of chess game played by Frank Poole and HAL 9000)
 Jipi and the Paranoid Chip
 AI control problem

References

External links

 Text excerpts from HAL 9000 in 2001: A Space Odyssey
 HAL's Legacy, on-line ebook (mostly full-text) of the printed version edited by David G. Stork, MIT Press, 1997, a collection of essays on HAL
 HAL's Legacy, An Interview with Arthur C. Clarke.
 The case for HAL's sanity by Clay Waldrop
 2001 fills the theater at HAL 9000's "birthday" in 1997 at the University of Illinois at Urbana–Champaign

Characters in British novels of the 20th century
Characters in written science fiction
Fictional artificial intelligences
Fictional virtual assistants
Fictional characters from Illinois
Film characters introduced in 1968
Fictional computers
Fictional mass murderers
Literary villains
Science fiction film characters
Space Odyssey
Male characters in literature